Declana leptomera is a species of moth in the family Geometridae. It is endemic to New Zealand.

References

Moths of New Zealand
Moths described in 1858
Endemic fauna of New Zealand
Ennominae
Taxa named by Francis Walker (entomologist)
Endemic moths of New Zealand